Platanus or Platanous was a town on the coast of Cilicia Aspera, west of Anemurium. The Stadiasmus Maris Magni places Platanus 350 stadia from Anemurium, which is most likely incorrect. William Smith posited a distance of 150 stadia.

Platanus is tentatively located near modern Melleç İskelesi, in Asiatic Turkey.

References

Populated places in ancient Cilicia
Former populated places in Turkey
History of Mersin Province